Morad Qoli may refer to:
 Morad Qoli, Kurdistan
 Morad Qoli, Sistan and Baluchestan